The 1958 United States Senate special election in North Carolina was held on November 4, 1958. Interim Democratic Senator B. Everett Jordan was elected to complete the unexpired term of Senator W. Kerr Scott, who had died in April.

Background
On April 16, 1958, Senator W. Kerr Scott died in office. On April 19, Governor of North Carolina Luther H. Hodges appointed B. Everett Jordan to fill the vacant seat until a successor could be duly elected. A special election to finish Kerr's term was scheduled for November 4, 1958, concurrent with the general election.

Jordan's appointment capped a twelve-year period during which eight different men held this Senate seat. He would hold the seat until 1975.

General election

Results

Notes

References

1958 United States Senate elections
1958
North Carolina
United States Senate
North Carolina 1958
North Carolina 1958
United States Senate 1958